
Gmina Krynice is a rural gmina (administrative district) in Tomaszów Lubelski County, Lublin Voivodeship, in eastern Poland.

Villages
Gmina Krynice contains the villages and settlements of Antoniówka, Budy Dzierążyńskie, Dąbrowa, Dzierążnia, Huta Dzierążyńska, Kolonia Partyzantów, Krynice, Majdan Krynicki, Majdan Sielec, Polanówka, Polany, Romanówka, Zaboreczno, Zadnoga, Zwiartów and Zwiartów-Kolonia.

Neighbouring gminas
Gmina Krynice is bordered by the gminas of Adamów, Komarów-Osada, Krasnobród, Łabunie, Rachanie and Tarnawatka.

References

Polish official population figures 2006

Krynice
Tomaszów Lubelski County